A radar detector is an electronic device used by motorists to detect if their speed is being monitored by police or law enforcement using a radar gun. Most radar detectors are used so the driver can reduce the car's speed before being ticketed for speeding. In general sense, only emitting technologies, like doppler RADAR, or LIDAR can be detected. Visual speed estimating techniques, like ANPR or  VASCAR can not be detected in daytime, but technically vulnerable to detection at night, when IR spotlight is used. There are no reports that piezo sensors can be detected. LIDAR devices require an optical-band sensor, although many modern detectors include LIDAR sensors. Most of today's radar detectors detect signals across a variety of wavelength bands: usually X, K, and Ka. In Europe the Ku band is common as well. The past success of radar detectors was based on the fact that radio-wave beams can not be narrow-enough, so the detector usually senses stray and scattered radiation, giving the driver time to slow down. Based on a focused laser-beam, LIDAR technology does not suffer this shortcoming; however it requires precise aiming. Modern police radars incorporate formidable computing power, producing a minimum number of ultra-short pulses, reusing wide beams for multi-target measurement, which renders most detectors useless. But, mobile Internet allows GPS navigation devices to map police radar locations in real-time. These devices are also often called "radar detectors", while not necessary carrying an RF sensor.

Description

One device law enforcement use to measure the expected speed of a moving vehicle is Doppler radar, which uses the Doppler effect to measure the relative speed of a vehicle. Doppler radar works by beaming a radio wave at a vehicle to then measure the expected change in frequency of the reflected wave (that bounces off the vehicle). Law enforcement often employs Doppler radar via hand-held radar guns, from vehicles, or from fixed objects such as traffic signals.

Radar detectors use a superheterodyne receiver to detect these electromagnetic emissions from the gun, and raise an alarm to notify the motorist when a transmission is detected. False alarms can occur however due to the large number of devices, such as automatic door openers (such as the ones at supermarkets and drug stores), speed signs, blind spot monitoring systems, poorly designed radar detectors and adaptive cruise control, that operate in the same part of the electromagnetic spectrum as radar guns.

In recent years, some radar detectors have added GPS technology. This allows users to manually store the locations where police frequently monitor traffic, with the detector sounding an alarm when approaching that location in the future (this is accomplished by pushing a button and doesn't require coordinates to be entered). These detectors also allow users to manually store the coordinates of sites of frequent false alarms, which the GPS enabled detector will then ignore. The detector can also be programmed to mute alerts when traveling below a preset speed, limiting unnecessary alerts. Some GPS enabled detectors can download the GPS coordinates of speed monitoring cameras and red-light cameras from the Internet, alerting the driver that they are approaching the camera.

Counter technology
Radar guns and detectors have evolved alternately over time to counter each other's technology in a form of civilian electronic "warfare".  For example, as new frequencies have been introduced, radar detectors have initially been "blind" to them until their technology, too, has been updated. Similarly, the length of time and strength of the transmissions have been lowered to reduce the chance of detection, which in turn has resulted in more sensitive receivers and more sophisticated software counter technology.  Lastly, radar detectors may combine other technologies, such as GPS-based technology with a point of interest database of known speed trapping locations, into a single device to improve their chances of success.

Radar detector detectors

The superheterodyne receiver in radar detectors has a local oscillator that radiates slightly, so it is possible to build a radar-detector detector, which detects such emissions (usually the frequency of the radar type being detected, plus about 10 MHz). The VG-2 Interceptor was the first device developed for this purpose, but has since been eclipsed by the Spectre III and Spectre Elite.  This form of "electronic warfare" cuts both ways - since detector-detectors use a similar superheterodyne receiver, many early "stealth" radar detectors were equipped with a radar-detector-detector-detector circuit, which shuts down the main radar receiver when the detector-detector's signal is sensed, thus preventing detection by such equipment.  This technique borrows from ELINT surveillance countermeasures. In the early 1990s, BEL-Tronics, Inc. of Ontario, Canada (where radar detector use is prohibited in most provinces) found that the local oscillator frequency of the detector could be altered to be out of the range of the VG-2 Interceptor (probably by using two LO stages such that neither is near the RF frequency). This resulted in detector manufacturers responding by changing their local oscillator frequency. Today, practically every radar detector on the market is immune to the VG-2 Interceptor. The VG-2 is no longer in production and radar detectors immune to the Spectre Elite are available.

Radar scrambling

It is illegal in many countries to sell or possess any products that actively transmit radar signals intended to jam radar equipment. In the United States, actively transmitting on a frequency licensed by the Federal Communications Commission (FCC) without a licence is a violation of FCC regulations, which may be punishable by fines up to $10,000 and/or up to one year imprisonment.

LIDAR detection

Newer speed detection devices use pulsed laser light, commonly referred to as LIDAR, rather than radio waves. Radar detectors, which detect radio transmissions, are unable to detect the infrared light emitted by LIDAR guns, so a different type of device called a LIDAR detector is required. However, LIDAR detection is not nearly as effective as radar detection because the output beam is very focused. A police officer targeting a car will most likely aim for the center mass or headlight of the vehicle and, because radar detectors are mounted on the windshield away from the beam's aim, they may not alert at all. This has resulted in some manufacturers producing LIDAR jammers. Unlike those of radar, LIDAR's frequencies and use are not controlled by the FCC. These jammers attempt to confuse police LIDAR into showing no speed on the display. They are often successful, and therefore many LIDAR manufacturers produce LIDAR guns that have "jam codes" that show when they are being jammed. They will work against some LIDAR jammers, but not all. In spite of this, police can often tell when they are being jammed when they see no reading on their LIDAR gun. Many jammer-equipped motorists try to counter this by reducing their speed to legal limits before turning off their jammer equipment, a technique known as "kill the equipment", referred to as "JTK" or "Jam to Kill." Officers can often detect this by observing that their LIDAR equipment is unable to lock in a speed properly, along with visual indication of sudden deceleration of the targeted vehicle. They will then pull the offending vehicle over and look for LIDAR jammers on the front of the vehicle, potentially ticketing the motorist with an obstruction of justice charge. Some states also have laws against jamming of police radar or LIDAR: California, Colorado, Illinois, Iowa, Minnesota, Oklahoma, South Carolina, Tennessee, Texas, Utah and Virginia. In these states, the penalties can be severe.

Despite the advent of LIDAR speed detection, radar remains more prevalent because of its lower price and the amount of radar equipment already in service. In addition, proper use of LIDAR equipment requires the officer to remain stationary in order to beam a very precise signal.

Legality

Using or possessing a radar detector or jammer is illegal in certain countries, and it may result in fines, seizure of the device, or both. These prohibitions generally are introduced under the premise that a driver who uses a radar detector will pose a greater risk of accident than a driver who does not.

The table below provides information about laws regarding radar detectors in particular nations. In 1967 devices to warn drivers of radar speed traps were being manufactured in the United Kingdom; they were deemed illegal under the Wireless Telegraphy Act 1949.

See also

 Laser jammer
 Road safety
 Traffic enforcement camera

References

Automotive electronics
Consumer electronics
Traffic law
Radar
Detectors
Radar warning receivers

de:Radarwarnanlage#Radarwarner im Straßenverkehr